The Yusay-Consing Mansion, originally known as the Lacson-Yusay Mansion, and now popularly known as the Molo Mansion, is a heritage house located in the district of Molo, Iloilo City, Philippines. It is located in front of the Molo Plaza and Molo Church. Built in 1926, it has neoclassical and subtle art deco features.

The property, including the mansion, is now owned by the SM Group, which now houses several souvenir shops that sell local products and delicacies, namely Kultura, Sabor Ilonggo, and Plantopia, as well as several coffee shops.

History 
The mansion was built in 1926 by the couple Doña Petra Lacson and Estanislao Yulo Yusay, a prominent lawyer and judge from Molo. They had ten children together. In 1940, Estanislao died, and Rosario Yusay, one of the couple's ten children, inherited the house. Rosario lived with her husband, Timoteo Consing Sr., who served as Iloilo governor from 1934 to 1937.

The property was handed down to the governor's son, Timoteo Consing Jr., and spouse, Nieva Ramirez-Consing, one of the owners of the sugar mill company Passi Sugar Central (acquired by the Universal Robina Corporation in 2007).

The Consing family sold the property to SM Group in 2014.

Gallery

References 

Buildings and structures in Iloilo City
Houses completed in 1926
Heritage Houses in the Philippines
Tourist attractions in Iloilo City
20th-century architecture in the Philippines